Lucas Lopes Beraldo (born 24 November 2003), or simply Lucas Beraldo, is a Brazilian professional footballer who plays as a centre-back for São Paulo.

Professional career
Beraldo made his professional debut with São Paulo at the 2022 Copa Sudamericana 1–0 win against Ayacucho, on 25 May 2022.

Career statistics

Club

Notes

Honours

Brazil

Torneio Internacional do Espírito Santo (U-20)
2022

References

External links
at ZeroZero.pt

2003 births
Living people
Association football defenders
Brazilian footballers
São Paulo FC players
Footballers from São Paulo
Brazil youth international footballers